Vaduz Cathedral, or Cathedral of St. Florin (German: St. Florinskirche in Vaduz or Kathedrale St. Florin), is a neo-Gothic church in Vaduz, Liechtenstein, and the centre of the Roman Catholic Archdiocese of Vaduz.  Originally a parish church, it has held the status of cathedral since 1997.

It was built in 1874 by Friedrich von Schmidt on the site of earlier medieval foundations.  Its patron saint is Florinus of Remüs (Florin), a 9th-century saint of the Vinschgau Valley.

The Archdiocese of Vaduz was erected by Pope John Paul II in the apostolic constitution Ad satius consulendum 2 December 1997. Before then it had been the Liechtenstein Deanery, a part of the Swiss Diocese of Chur. The solemn public ceremony took place on December 12, 1997, in the parish church of Vaduz, which was then raised to the dignity of a cathedral.

Burials 
 Prince Franz Joseph II of Liechtenstein (1989).
 Princess Georgina of Liechtenstein (1989). 
 Prince Franz Josef "Wenzel" of Liechtenstein (1991).
 Princess Marie of Liechtenstein (2021).
 Princess Elisabeth of Liechtenstein (in the Fürstliche Gruft).
 Prince Karl Aloys of Liechtenstein (in the Fürstliche Gruft).
 Princess Elisabeth of Liechtenstein (in the Fürstliche Gruft).
 Prince Aloys of Liechtenstein
 Archduchess Elisabeth Amalie of Austria
 Archduchess Maria Annunciata of Austria
 Prince Johannes of Liechtenstein
 Prince Ferdinand of Liechtenstein
 Prince Heinrich Hartneid of Liechtenstein
 Constantin von Liechtenstein
 Vincenz Liechtenstein

Gallery

See also
 Roman Catholicism in Liechtenstein

External links

  Pfarrei St. Florin auf der Internetpräsenz des Erzbistums Vaduz
   Kirche St. Florin auf der Internetpräsenz der Gemeinde Vaduz

1874 establishments in Liechtenstein
Roman Catholic churches completed in 1874
Cathedral
Cathedral
Catholic Church in Liechtenstein
Gothic Revival church buildings in Liechtenstein
Roman Catholic cathedrals in Liechtenstein
Burial sites of the House of Urach
19th-century Roman Catholic church buildings